Muhammad ibn Abd al-Karim al-Khattabi, better known as Abd el-Krim (1882 or 1883, Ajdir, Morocco – 6 February 1963, Cairo, Egypt) was a Moroccan political and military leader and the President of the Republic of the Rif. He and his brother M'Hammad led a large-scale revolt by a coalition of Riffian tribes against French and Spanish colonization of the Rif, in Morocco. His guerrilla tactics, which included the first-ever use of tunneling as a technique of modern warfare, directly influenced Ho Chi Minh, Mao Zedong and Che Guevara.

Early life 
Muhammad ibn Abd al-Karim was born in 1882/1883 in Ajdir, Morocco. He was the son of Abd al-Karim al-Khattabi, a qadi (Islamic judge and chief local leader) of the Aith Yusuf clan of the Aith Uriaghel (or Waryaghar) tribe. Abd el-Krim received a customary formative education at a local school in Ajdir and subsequently attended an institute at Tetouan. At the age of 20, he studied for two years in Fez at the Al Attarine and Saffarin madrasas and subsequently enrolled as a student at the  University of al-Qarawiyyin, the world's oldest institution of higher education. Both Muhammad and his brother M'Hammad received a Spanish education, the latter studying mine engineering in Málaga and Madrid. Both spoke fluent Spanish and Riffian. 

Following his studies, Abd el-Krim worked in Melilla (a Spanish enclave from 1494 to the present day) as a teacher and translator for the OCTAI, the Spanish 'native affairs' office, and as a journalist for the Spanish newspaper Telegrama del Rif (1906–1915). In 1907, he was hired to edit and write articles in Arabic for El Telegrama del Rif, a daily newspaper in Melilla, where he defended the advantages of European—especially Spanish—civilization and technology and their potential to elevate the economic and cultural level of the Moroccan population. In 1910, Abd el-Krim took a position as secretary-interpreter in the Native Affairs Office in Melilla, which brought him into close contact with the Spanish military bureaucracy and the town's civil society and gained a reputation for intelligence, efficiency and discretion.

World War I 

Abd el-Krim entered the Spanish administration first as a secretary in the Bureau of Native Affairs, and he was later appointed chief qadi for Melilla in 1915. He taught at a Hispano-Arabic school and was an editor for the Arab section of the newspaper, El Telegrama del Rif.

Before and after the outbreak of World War I, Abd el-Krim was noted as Germanophile, defending it on the basis of arguments brought from the Egyptian and Turkish press. Abd-el-Krim offered himself as broker to the Germans to get them mining licenses in the mountains of Beni Uriaguel. His father was indeed one of the leading elements of the German–Turkish operations in the Rif.

In the midst of the conflict, he was arrested. The Spanish authorities sought to please the French, who had claimed the German agents roamed free in Melilla, thus they proceeded to hear a number of complaints on Abd el-Krim. One of the complaints dealt with an alleged involvement in a conspiracy with the German consul Walter Zechlin (1879–1962). He was imprisoned in Chefchaouen from 1916 to 1918 but then escaped. He regained his job as a judge in Melilla. At the end of the war, Abd el-Krim briefly resumed publishing in a Spanish-language newspaper, but, fearing extradition to French Morocco, he returned to his home at Ajdir in January 1919. He was alarmed by the appearance of Spanish agents in Ayt Weryaghel tribal territory and decided to fight for his tribe's independence.

In 1920, Abd el-Krim, together with his brother, began a war of rebellion against the Spanish incursions. His goal was to unite the tribes of the Rif into an independent Republic of the Rif, to dismantle the entire French-Spanish colonial project in Morocco and to introduce modern political reform.

Guerrilla leadership 

In 1921, as a byproduct of their efforts to destroy the power of a local brigand, Ahmed er Raisuni, Spanish troops approached the unoccupied areas of the Rif. Abd-el-Krim sent their commander, General Manuel Fernández Silvestre, a warning that if the troops crossed the Ameqqran River, he would consider it as an act of war. Silvestre is said to have dismissed the warning, and shortly afterwards, crossed the river with 60,000 men and set up a military post in the foothills of Abarran mountains. In June 1921 a sizable Riffian force attacked this post killing 179 of the estimated 250 Spanish troops there. Soon afterwards, Abd el-Krim directed his forces to attack the Spanish army camp at Anwal, which they did with great success. During the attack, General Silvestre, head of the Spanish forces, committed suicide when he saw that defeat was inevitable. In three weeks of fierce battles, 13,000 Spanish and colonial troops were killed. The Rifians' colossal victory established Abd el-Krim as a master and pioneer of guerrilla warfare, and the president of the Republic of the Rif. By July, the remainder of the 60,000 Spanish soldiers who were not killed or captured had fled to the coast, and into Melilla, defeated by an army of 30,000 Rifian fighters.

The catastrophic defeat of the Spanish forces at Annual and the ensuing massacre of Spaniards at Monte Arruit delivered a coup de grace  to the Restoration regime in that country, and what it was known as the African "adventure" became referred to as the Moroccan "mess" or "cancer". A coup d'état led by Miguel Primo de Rivera installed a dictatorship in Spain in September 1923.

By 1924, the Spanish forces had retreated, because of more defeats at the hands of Abd el-Krim, to three isolated cities along the Moroccan coast: Tetouan, Ceuta and Melilla (the two latter under Spanish jurisdiction to this day). After Abd el-Krim invaded French-occupied Morocco in April 1925 and made it as far as Fez, France decided to take strong steps to put down the revolt. The French government, in 1925, after conferencing with the Spanish in Madrid, sent a massive French force under Marshal Henri Philippe Pétain to Morocco, where it joined with a Spanish army, with a combined total of more than 250,000 soldiers, supported by large numbers of aircraft and artillery, and began operations against the Rif Republic. By September 1925 the Spanish Army of África, supported by a combined Spanish-French fleet, landed in Alhucemas bay, barely a dozen miles from Abd-el-Krim's capital and birthplace, Axdir, while several colonial and even metropolitan French regiments were coming from the south toward the heartlands of the Rifian rebellion.

Intense combat lasted ten months, but eventually, the combined French and Spanish armies, which used chemical bombs against the population as well as other weapons, defeated the forces of Abd el-Krim and inflicted extensive damage on the local Berber population. On 26 May 1926, Abd el-Krim surrendered to the French at his then headquarters of Targuist (Targist).

Exile 

Following his surrender Abd el-Krim was exiled to the island of Réunion (a French territory in the Indian Ocean) from 1926 to 1947, where he was "given a comfortable estate and generous annual subsidiary". In exile, he continued his fierce anti-Western rhetoric, and he pushed to keep western trends from encroaching on Moroccan culture.

In 1947, Abd el-Krim was given permission to live in the south of France after he had been released on health grounds; however, he succeeded in gaining asylum in Egypt. There he presided over the Liberation Committee of the Arab Maghreb.

After Morocco gained independence in 1956, Mohammed V of Morocco invited him back to Morocco. He refused as long as French forces were on North African soil.
From Egypt, he gave his support to the Rif revolt in 1958 against the Moroccan government.

Death
He died in 1963, just after he had seen his hopes of a Maghreb independent of colonial powers completed by the independence of Algeria.

Family 

Abd el-Krim had 6 sons and 5 daughters from two different women.

Honors and awards 
 :
  Order of Isabella the Catholic (Spain; Knight's Cross; 1910)
  Cross of Military Merit (Spain; Grand Cross - Red Decoration; 1910)
  Cross of Military Merit (Spain; Grand Cross - White Decoration; 1910)
  Medalla de África (Spain; Medal; 1910)
  Medalla de la Paz de Marruecos (Spain; Medal; 1910)

 :
  Order of the Republic of Tunisia (Tunisia; Grand Cross; 1960)

Sources

 Asprey, R.B. (2002) War in the Shadows: The Guerrilla in History, iUniverse Publishing. .
 Boyd, C. (1979) Praetorian Politics in Liberal Spain, University of North Carolina Press: Chapel Hill, North Carolina. .
 Carr, R. (1980) Modern Spain: 1875-1980, Oxford University Press: Oxford. .
 Castro, F., Ramonet, I. & Hurley, A. (2008) Fidel Castro: My Life: a Spoken Autobiography, Scribner: New York. .
 Cowley, R. & Parker, G. (eds.) (1996) The Reader's Companion to Military History, Houghton Mifflin: Boston. .
 
 Hart, D.M. (1976) The Aith Waryaghar of the Moroccan Rif, History Fund Publications: Tucson, Arizona. .
 Keegan, J. & Wheatcroft, A. (2014) Who's Who in Military History: From 1453 to the Present Day, Routledge Publishing: New York. .
 
 Pierson, P. (1999) The History of Spain, Greenwood Press: Westport, Connecticut. .

References 

Bibliography

Further reading 

 Abdelkrim, Mémoires d'Abd el Krim / recueillis par J. Roger-Mathieu, (in French), Paris, Librairie des Champs Elysées, 1927
 Abdelkrim, Mémoires II, la Crise franco-marocaine, 1955—1956,  (in French), Paris, Plon, 1984
 Bensoussan, David, Il était une fois le Maroc : témoignages du passé judéo-marocain , éd. du Lys, www.editionsdulys.ca, Montréal, 2010; Second edition : www.iuniverse.com, Bloomington, IN, 2012, 620p.  (ebook)
 
 Montagne, R. (1954) Révolution au Maroc (in French), Paris: France Empire. 
 Pennell, C.R. (1986) A Country with a Government and a Flag: The Rif War in Morocco, 1921-1926, Menas: UK. .
 Pennell, C. R. (2000) Morocco since 1830: A History, Hurst: London. .  
 Tamburini, F. (Sep 2005) "I gas nella guerra del Rif", Storia Militare, n.145, a.XIII
 Woolman, David S. 1968.  Rebels in the Rif: Abd el Krim and the Rif Rebellion, Stanford University Press, California

External links 

 The Notes of the Rif Revolt
 The Republic of the Rif
 Biography of Abd el-Krim in tha mazight (Rif)
 Next publication of Abd el-Krim's biography in base of official Spanish documents
 

Asharis
Sunni Muslims
African resistance to colonialism
Berber Moroccans
Berber rebels
Berber scholars
Berber writers
Heads of state of former unrecognized countries
Guerrilla warfare theorists
Heads of state in Africa
Moroccan Berber politicians
Moroccan dissidents
Moroccan emigrants to Egypt
Moroccan exiles
20th-century Moroccan judges
Moroccan military leaders
Moroccan revolutionaries
Moroccan scholars
Moroccan schoolteachers
Moroccan Sunni Muslim scholars of Islam
Moroccan writers
Moroccan independence activists
People from Ajdir
Riffian people
University of al-Qarawiyyin alumni
20th-century Moroccan educators
1880s births
1963 deaths